Aruk (also Romanized as Arūk; also known as Ardāk) is a village in Pas Kalut Rural District, in the Central District of Gonabad County, Razavi Khorasan Province, Iran. At the 2006 census, its population was 219, in 48 families.

See also 

 List of cities, towns and villages in Razavi Khorasan Province

References 

Populated places in Gonabad County